Jamie Reeves (born 3 May 1962) is a British former coal miner, strongman and professional wrestler. As a strongman, he won the 1989 World's Strongest Man, was World Muscle Power champion, and also had numerous other titles including Europe's Strongest Man and Britain's Strongest Man. Following retirement from competitive sport he continued to be involved in strength athletics as a referee, event promoter and coach.

Early life
Reeves was born in 1962 in Sheffield, Yorkshire. He grew up in the city and went to the City School. At school he had been a swimmer at county level, a centre-forward for his football team and had also played as Number 8 in the rugby union side that won the under-15 Yorkshire Cup. He went on to become a colliery blacksmith's welder before his success as a strongman led him to give up that profession.

Strongman
When Reeves saw Bill Kazmaier win his third World's Strongest Man title in 1982, on BBC television, he decided that would be his aim, and took up weights. By 1986 he had become the Yorkshire and North East powerlifting champion in the superheavy class. In addition to powerlifting he had become actively involved in strength athletics and in 1986 won the National Truck Pulling Championships (sponsored by ASA/Bristol Street Motors) and came second to Peter Tregloan in 1986 in the Midland's Strongest Man competition. In 1987 he improved on his second-place finish by winning the Midland's Strongest Man (the first of three consecutive wins). That year he also won the first of three consecutive Yorkshire's Strongest Man competitions and won the England's Strongest Man competition also. In 1988 he took the title of East Britain's Strongest Man and entered John Smith's Trial of Strength, a competition organised by Geoff Capes and David Webster in order to find the successor to the retired Capes. He won the title, the equivalent that year of Britain's Strongest Man. Underlining his calibre, he then broke Tom Topham's 274-year-old record by harness lifting three beer barrels weighing a total of 845 kg.

This performances culminated in an invitation to the 1988 World's Strongest Man where he finished third on his first attempt, to Jón Páll Sigmarsson and Bill Kazmaier. The following year he won the competition in San Sebastián again excelling in gripping events, seen as his speciality. He was injured for the next two competitions and on his return in 1992 came second equal with Magnús Ver Magnússon. Domestically, he won the British Muscle Power Championships and Britain's Strongest Man on numerous occasions and in total was nine times England's Strongest Man.

Powerlifting
Jamie's best results in IPF or WPC powerlifting competition are:
Squat –  (IPF)
Bench press –  (done at WPC Push-Pull exhibition meet in 1994 in England)
Deadlift –  (IPF)
All lifts performed "raw" (no power suits or bench shirts)

Retirement
After retiring from strength sports, Jamie became an International Federation of Strength Athletes judge, and ran his own gym.

Statistics
 Height: 6 ft 3 in (190.5 cm)
 Weight: 322 lb (146 kg).
BMI: 40.2
 Chest: 60 inches
 Biceps: 22 inches

References

1962 births
Living people
English strength athletes
British strength athletes
People educated at The City School, Sheffield
Sportspeople from Yorkshire